Clon may refer to:

 Clonakilty, or Clon, a town in County Cork, Ireland
 Clon (duo), a South Korean dance duo
 El clon ('The Clone'), a 2010 Spanish-language telenovela released

See also
 
 Clonmacnoise, a ruined monastery in County Offaly, Ireland 
 O Clone ('The Clone'), a 2001 Brazilian telenovela